Dent may refer to:

People
 Dent (surname)
 Dent May (active 2007), American musician
 Dent Mowrey (1888–1960), American composer, musician and music teacher
 Dent Oliver (1918–1973), international speedway rider

Places

France
 Dent d'Oche, Haute-Savoie
 Dent de Burgin, Savoie
 Dent Parrachée, Savoie
 Denting, Moselle

Switzerland
 Dent Blanche, a mountain in the Pennine Alps
 Dent d'Hérens (shared with Italy), a mountain in the Pennine Alps
 Dent de Lys, a mountain in the Bernese Alps (Swiss Prealps)
 Dents du Midi, a multi-summited mountain situated in the Chablais Alps

United Kingdom
 Dent (fell), near England's Lake District in Cleator Moor, Copeland, Cumbria
 Dent, South Lakeland, a village near Sedbergh in Cumbria, formerly in Yorkshire
 Dent railway station
 Dent Bank, a small village in County Durham
 Dent Fault, in northern England
 Dent Group, a group of Upper Ordovician sedimentary and volcanic rocks in northwest England

United States
 Dent, Idaho
 Dent, Minnesota
 Dent, Missouri
 Dent, Ohio
 Dent, West Virginia
 Dent Bridge, in north central Idaho
 Dent County, Missouri
 Dent site, a Clovis culture site near Milliken, Colorado
 Fort Dent

Arts, entertainment, and media
 Dent (Pokémon), the Japanese name for a gym leader in Pokémon Black and White, named Cilan in English
 Dent (Pokémon anime), the Japanese name for a main character in the Pokémon: Black & White anime series, named Cilan in English
 Arthur Dent, protagonist of the science fiction series The Hitchhiker's Guide to the Galaxy
 Harvey Dent, aka Two-Face, a DC comics fictional villain

Companies
 Dent (clocks and watches), the manufacturer of London's Big Ben
 Dent & Co., a major trading company in Hong Kong's early colonial days
 Dents, a British leather goods company founded in 1777
 J. M. Dent & Sons, a British publishing company founded by J. M. Dent in 1888

Other uses
 Dent (conference), an annual leadership conference in Sun Valley, Idaho
 Dent Corn, a variety of maize with a high soft starch content
USS Dent (DD-116), a United States Navy ship

See also
 
 
 Dent Island (disambiguation)
 Dent Township (disambiguation)
 Denton (disambiguation)